This is a List of Landmarks in Camden, South Carolina, United States.

Historic landmarks 

Camden, South Carolina
Camden
South Carolina-related lists
Historic Landmarks